List of Turkish poets may refer to:
List of Ottoman poets
List of contemporary Turkish poets